Azure Parsons (born October 5, 1984) is an American actress. She has appeared in a number of films, including 2 Guns, Paradise, and Dark Places, and television shows like Death Valley, Castle, and True Detective. In 2014, Parsons was cast as a recurring character in the first season of the fantasy drama series Salem on WGN America. In 2016, she returned to recur in the third season of Salem. She starred as Annie Glenn on the ABC drama series The Astronaut Wives Club.

Filmography

Film

Television

References

External links

1984 births
21st-century American actresses
Actresses from New Orleans
American film actresses
American television actresses
Living people